The Depretis V government of Italy held office from 25 May 1883 until 30 March 1884, a total of 310 days, or 10 months and 5 days.

Government parties
The government was composed by the following parties:

Composition

References

Italian governments
1883 establishments in Italy